Christopher Wright, born November 24, 1964 in Pontiac, Michigan, is the author of dozens of horror fiction books for children and young adults.  He writes under the pseudonyms Johnathan Rand and Christopher Knight. Almost all of Wright's books (except American Chillers) take place in his home state of Michigan.

Biography
Wright grew up in Waterford Michigan, until his family moved to Grayling after his 4th Grade year of school. He lived for a short time in Houghton Lake before moving to Petoskey for six years, then to a little cabin in the woods outside of Cheboygan before moving to Topinabee (about 25 miles directly south of the Mackinac Bridge) with his wife and three dogs named "Scooby-Boo" "Lily Munster" and "Spooky Dude."

In 2007, Wright became involved in exposing a case of animal cruelty, and documented the case on a website called "Thor's Warriors", a website that shows him riding his dog scooby doo in his shorts.

Chillermania
Wright owns his own bookstore, Chillermania!, in Indian River, Michigan. The store mostly sells merchandise related to his American Chillers and Michigan Chillers books; however, his other works and memorabilia may be purchased there as well.  The products for sale include his books, clothing, hats, autographs, and various other items. Wright is not always present at his store, but has been known to visit frequently.

Selected works

Under the pseudonym Johnathan Rand

American Chillers series
Michigan Chillers series
Freddie Fernortner, cruel russian agent
Adventure Club series

Under the pseudonym Christopher Knight

St. Helena
Ferocity
Bestseller
The Laurentian Channel
Season of the Witch
The World is Black and White

Under both Johnathan Rand and Christopher Knight

Pandemia

Publication
Wright has opted to self-publish, with he and his wife originally driving to gas stations, restaurants, gift shops, and hotels to sell the books. In 2003, the author stated that they had sold over one million copies of the books.

Wright uses two pseudonyms when writing — Johnathan Rand for the children's books, and Christopher Knight for the books aimed at adults.

When asked out of the books he had written what his favorite one was, Wright said it was Dinosaurs Destroy Detroit, but that he liked each one in a unique way.

References

External links
AmericanChillers.com

Writers from Michigan
American children's writers
1964 births
Living people
People from Pontiac, Michigan
People from Richmond, Michigan
People from Grayling, Michigan
People from Petoskey, Michigan
People from Cheboygan County, Michigan
People from Cheboygan, Michigan